The 1919 season was the tenth in the history of the Isthmian League, an English football competition.

Of the eleven clubs who competed in the 1913–14 season, only five returned for this season; four did not resume until the 1919–20 season, whilst two (New Crusaders and Shepherd's Bush) had left the league. Leytonstone were champions, winning their first Isthmian League title.

League table

References

Isthmian League seasons
I
Isthmian League